Baltimore Highlands may refer to a location in Maryland, the United States:

Baltimore Highlands, Maryland, a census-designated place in southern Baltimore County
Baltimore Highlands (Baltimore Light Rail station)
Lansdowne-Baltimore Highlands, Maryland, former census-designated place
Baltimore Highlands, Baltimore, a neighborhood in east Baltimore city